Cameron DeJong (born October 3, 1979) is a Republican former member of the New Hampshire House of Representatives from the Hillsborough 9th District. In 2002 he received a BA in political science from Elon University. During his term in the New Hampshire House of Representatives, DeJong co-sponsored a bill promoting Approval Voting. In addition, DeJong professed his Christian faith in a Floor speech expressing support for marriage equality. DeJong did not run for re-election in 2012 citing a disgust for deal-making and lobbyist influence in politics. In 2011 he endorsed Republican presidential candidate Ron Paul. In 2016, DeJong supported Rand Paul for President.

References

External links
Cameron DeJong's Project Vote Smart Biography.

Members of the New Hampshire House of Representatives
1979 births
Living people
Elon University alumni